John Blair Hoge (February 2, 1825 – March 1, 1896) was an American journalist, lawyer, and Democratic politician who served as a  United States Representative from West Virginia. He was a member of the 47th United States Congress.

Biography
Hoge was born  in Richmond, Virginia, on February 2, 1825. After studying law, he was admitted to the bar in April 1845 and entered practice in Martinsburg. He was chosen president of the Bank of Berkeley, Virginia (now West Virginia), in 1853. He served in the Virginia House of Delegates from 1855 to 1859. He was chosen as a delegate to the Democratic National Conventions at Charleston and Baltimore in 1860. During the American Civil War, he served in the Confederate Army as both a line and staff officer until paroled in 1865.

He worked as a journalist and resumed his law practice in Martinsburg, West Virginia, in 1870. He served as a delegate to the State constitutional convention in 1872. He was chosen to serve as a member of the Democratic National Committee from 1872 to 1876. He served as a judge on the third judicial circuit in 1872. He resigned in August 1880 to run for Congress.  He was elected from West Virginia's 2nd District in 1880 to the Forty-seventh Congress (March 4, 1881 – March 3, 1883). Subsequently, he served as United States Attorney for the District of Columbia from 1885 to 1889. He died in Martinsburg on March 1, 1896, and was buried there in Norborne Cemetery.

See also
United States congressional delegations from West Virginia

Notes

Sources

1825 births
1896 deaths
American bank presidents
Military personnel from West Virginia
Confederate States Army officers
Journalists from West Virginia
Democratic Party members of the Virginia House of Delegates
Politicians from Martinsburg, West Virginia
Politicians from Richmond, Virginia
People of West Virginia in the American Civil War
Virginia lawyers
West Virginia lawyers
Democratic Party members of the United States House of Representatives from West Virginia
19th-century American journalists
American male journalists
19th-century American male writers
19th-century American politicians
Journalists from Virginia
United States Attorneys for the District of Columbia
Lawyers from Richmond, Virginia
19th-century American lawyers
19th-century American businesspeople
Lawyers from Martinsburg, West Virginia